Arawa is the largest town and the former capital of the Autonomous Region of Bougainville in Papua New Guinea. It is administered under Arawa Rural LLG.

The town was largely destroyed during the Bougainville Civil War, resulting in the relocation of the capital to Buka, though there are plans to rebuild Arawa and make it the capital again. The land where Arawa is now situated was previously a large expatriate plantation.

History
When Bougainville Copper Ltd needed a civic headquarters for dealing with the local and national government instrumentalities, Arawa Plantation was an obvious candidate. It was in close proximity to Kieta, the historic district headquarters whose geographical location made expansion difficult. It was also close to new commercial port facilities at Loloho in Anewa Bay north of Arawa, in addition to the small longstanding port near Kieta, which allowed rural agricultural products to be loaded onto cargo ships. The extremely busy Aropa Airport was south of Kieta, immediately adjacent to the sea.

The townsite was quickly developed through the 1970s and 1980s with residential neighbourhoods, commercial enterprises, large public schools in addition to long-established Roman Catholic schools in Kieta, a public library, hotels and restaurants and entertainment facilities such as a film theatre.

Villagers throughout Bougainville Island and Buka Island had long been accustomed to seeing films at church stations, while residents from elsewhere greatly desired them; videos were common and frequently shown by Lutheran, Anglican and Baptist churches in the area in an attempt to attract converts. These denominations did not previously operate on Bougainville and Buka, which prior to the Panguna mine had largely been Roman Catholic and Methodist United Church in Papua New Guinea and the Solomon Islands.

See also
Arawa Rural LLG

References

Populated places in the Autonomous Region of Bougainville
Provincial capitals in Papua New Guinea
Populated places established in 1884
1884 establishments in Oceania